The Nakajima Ki-49 Donryu (呑龍, "Storm Dragon") was a twin-engine Japanese World War II heavy bomber. It was designed to carry out daylight bombing missions, without the protection of escort fighters. Consequently, while its official designation, Army Type 100 Heavy Bomber, was accurate in regard to its formidable defensive armament and armor, these features restricted the Ki-49 to payloads comparable to those of lighter medium bombers – the initial production variant could carry only  of bombs.

A mid-wing, cantilever monoplane of all-metal construction, the Ki-49 was one of the first Japanese aircraft fitted with a retractable tailwheel. During World War II, it was known to the Allies by the reporting name "Helen".

Development
The Ki-49 was designed to replace the Mitsubishi Ki-21 ("Sally"), which entered service with the Imperial Japanese Army Air Force in 1938. Learning from service trials of the Ki-21, the Army realized that however advanced it may have been at the time of its introduction, its new Mitsubishi bomber would in due course be unable to operate without fighter escorts. The Japanese Army stipulated that its replacement should have the speed and defensive weaponry to enable it to operate independently.

The prototype first flew in August 1939 and the development programme continued through three prototypes and seven pre-production aircraft. This first prototype was powered by a pair of  Nakajima Ha-5 KA-I radial engines but the next two had the  Nakajima Ha-41 engines that were intended for the production version. Seven more prototypes were built and these completed the test programme for the aircraft. Eventually in March 1941, the Donryu went into production as the Army Type 100 Heavy Bomber Model 1.

Operational history

Going operational from autumn 1941, the Ki-49 first saw service in China. After the outbreak of the Pacific War it was also active in the New Guinea area and in raids on Australia. Like the prototype, these early versions were armed with five  machine guns and one  cannon. Combat experience in China and New Guinea showed the Donryu to be underpowered, with bomb capacity and speed suffering as a result. Thus, in the spring of 1942 an up-engined version was produced, fitted with more powerful Ha-109 engines and this became the production Army Type 100 Heavy Bomber Model 2 or Ki-49-IIa. The Model 2 also introduced improved armor and self-sealing fuel tanks and was followed by the Ki-49-IIb in which  Ho-103 machine guns replaced three of the  Type 89 machine guns.

In spite of these improvements, losses continued to mount as the quantity and quality of fighter opposition rose. In early 1943 further power increases were delayed owing to development difficulties with the  Nakajima Ha-117 engines and the Ki-49-III never entered production with only six prototypes being built.

In the face of its increasing vulnerability to opposing fighter aircraft while performing its intended role, the Ki-49 was used in other roles towards the end of the Pacific War, including anti-submarine warfare patrol, troop transport and as a kamikaze.

After 819 aircraft had been completed, production ended in December 1944.
50 of these were built by Tachikawa.

Variants

 Ki-49Prototypes and pre-series models with a  Nakajima Ha-5 KAI or the  Ha-4. The pre-series with little modifications from the prototype.
 Ki-49-IArmy Type 100 Heavy Bomber Model 1, first production version.
 Ki-49-IITwo prototypes fitted with two Nakajima Ha-109 radial piston engines.
 Ki-49-IIaArmy Type 100 Heavy Bomber Model 2A - Production version with Ha-109 engines and armament as Model 1.
 Ki-49-IIbVersion of Model 2 with  Ho-103 machine guns replacing rifle caliber weapons.
 Ki-49-IIISix prototypes fitted with two  Nakajima Ha-117 engines.
 Ki-58Escort fighter with Ha-109 engines, 5 x  cannon, 3 x  machine guns. 3 prototypes built.
 Ki-80Specialized pathfinder aircraft - 2 prototypes; employed as engine test-beds.

Operators

Wartime

 Imperial Japanese Army Air Force
 No. 61 Hikō Sentai IJAAF
 No. 62 Hikō Sentai IJAAF
 No. 74 Hikō Sentai IJAAF
 No. 95 Hikō Sentai IJAAF
 No. 110 Hikō Sentai IJAAF
 No. 11 Hikōshidan IJAAF
 Hamamatsu Army Heavy Bomber School

Post-war

 3 captured aircraft were used between 1946 and 1949 in Indochina

 Indonesian Air Force - Ex-Japanese Aircraft were operated by Indonesian guerilla forces after the war.

 Royal Thai Air Force - Utilized 1 Nakajima Ki-49 as a transport post war, during 1945-46

Specifications (Ki-49-IIa)

See also

References

Notes

Bibliography
 
 

 

Ki-49, Nakajima
Ki-049
Mid-wing aircraft
Aircraft first flown in 1939
Twin piston-engined tractor aircraft
Ki-49, Nakajima